Kiskunság ("Little Cumania") is a historical and geographical region in Hungary situated in the current  between Kalocsa and Szeged. Its territory is 2,423 km2. Like other historical European regions called Cumania, it is named for the Cumans, a historically very significant nomadic tribe.

See also
Kunság (Cumania)
Nagykunság (Greater Cumania)

References

Historical regions in Hungary
Geography of Hungary
Biosphere reserves of Hungary
Historical regions in the Kingdom of Hungary